George Huntston Williams (April 7, 1914, in Huntsburg – October 6, 2000) was an American academic, historian of Christianity, and professor of Nontrinitarian Christian theology. His works focused on the historical research of Nontrinitarian Christian movements that emerged during the Protestant Reformation, primarily Socinianism and Unitarianism.

Biography
Williams' father was a Unitarian minister in Ohio. Williams studied at St. Lawrence University (graduated 1936) and Meadville Theological School (graduated 1939). After his academic studies in history of Christianity at the European universities of Paris and Strasbourg, he returned to the United States and became assistant minister of a Unitarian church in Rockford, Illinois, where he married his wife Marjorie Derr in 1941.

From 1941 onwards, he taught Church history at the Unitarian-affiliated Starr King School for the Ministry in Berkeley, California, and at the nearby Pacific School of Religion, while studying for his Th.D. completed at Union Theological Seminary, New York (1946). From 1947 he taught at Harvard Divinity School, being appointed Winn Professor of Ecclesiastical History from 1956 to 1963.

In 1981 he was appointed to the Hollis Chair of Divinity. He was among the original Editorial Advisors of the scholarly journal Dionysius. As an anti-abortion activist, he became the first chairman of the board of Americans United for Life.

Works
 Spiritual and Anabaptist Writers: Documents Illustrative of the Radical Reformation, 1957
 The Polish Brethren : Documentation of the History and Thought of Unitarianism in the Polish-Lithuanian Commonwealth and in the Diaspora 1601-1685, Scholars Press, 1980, .
 The Radical Reformation, 1962 .
 Unterschiede zwischen dem polnischen und dem siebenbürgisch-ungarischen Unitarismus und ihre Ursachen, in: Wolfgang Deppert/Werner Erdt/Aart de Groot (Hrsg.): Der Einfluß der Unitarier auf die europäisch-amerikanische Geistesgeschichte, Peter Lang Verlag, Frankfurt am Main/Bern/New York/Paris 1990, ISSN 0930-4118, S. 33-57.
 Article The Attitude of Liberals in New England toward Non-Christian Religions, 1784–1885, Crane Review 9.

References

External links
 A collection of papers on anti-abortion organizations in the United States and abortion issues by George Huntston Williams is in the Harvard Divinity School Library at Harvard Divinity School in Cambridge, Massachusetts.

1914 births
2000 deaths
20th-century American academics
20th-century American male writers
20th-century American historians
21st-century American academics
21st-century American male writers
21st-century American historians
American anti-abortion activists
American expatriate academics
American expatriates in France
American expatriates in West Germany
American historians of religion
American male non-fiction writers
American religious writers
American Unitarian Universalists
Harvard Divinity School faculty
Historians from New York (state)
Historians of Protestantism
Presidents of the American Society of Church History
Reformation historians
St. Lawrence University alumni
Union Theological Seminary (New York City) alumni
Unitarian Universalist clergy
United Church of Christ ministers
University of Paris alumni
University of Strasbourg alumni